Anatoli Ivanovich Rogozhin (12 April 1893 – 6 April 1972) was a Russian officer who served in the Imperial Russian Army, the White Army, and was the last commander of the Russian Corps in Serbia during World War II.

Biography 
He was born on April 12, 1893, in the Chervlen stanitza of the Terek Cossack Host, the son of a cossack officer. After being raised in a cadet school and completing the Nikolaevsk Cavalry School, Rogozhin commanded several cossack units in Persia. Returning to Russia in 1914, Rogozhin fought on the South-Western front during World War I. He then served in Kyiv, then went to Terek where his unit confronted rebellion in the face of the February Revolution.

Career 
In June 1918, Rogozhin participated in the Terek Cossack rebellion against the Bolsheviks and became a part of the White movement.

After evacuating from Russia, Rogozhin served in the Kingdom of Serbs, Croats, and Slovenes in the border patrol. During World War II he joined the Russian Corps, becoming the commander of a regiment. He received an Iron Cross second class for  bravery in battle. Upon the death of General Boris Shteifon, he became the last commander of the Corps.

Rogozhin managed to negotiate a surrender with the British forces. He and his men were targeted for repatriation to the SMERSH but were saved by British general Steele. He became the commander of the refugee camp. He also helped organize the evacuation of Russian veterans of the Corps and was one of the last to leave the camp in 1951. Organizing the Russian Corps Combatants veterans organization (Союз Чинов Русского Корпуса), he also established the Nashi Vesti (Our News) periodical magazine.

Rogozhin moved to the United States where he continued being active in white emigre organizations. He died on April 6, 1972, and is buried in the Novo Deveevo Russian Orthodox convent in Nanuet, New York, by a chapel dedicated to the Corps.

See also 
 Volunteer Army
 Russian Corps

References 
  "Nashi Vesti". Is published by Russian Corps combatants(rus)

1893 births
1972 deaths
Cossacks from the Russian Empire
American people of Russian descent
Military personnel of the Russian Empire
White Russian emigrants to Yugoslavia
Yugoslav emigrants to the United States
Russian collaborators with Nazi Germany
Russian military personnel of World War I
White movement people
Anti-communists from the Russian Empire
Russian Corps personnel